The Akkineni–Daggubati family is a prominent Indian film family with a history predominantly in Telugu cinema. Akkineni Nageswara Rao and Daggubati Ramanaidu are the prominent heads of both families. Members of the family include actors, film directors, and producers.

Family Tree 

Note: Dashed lines indicate separation.

First generation
 Akkineni Nageswara Rao, actor and producer, known by his initials ANR 
  Married to Annapurna Kollipara
 D. Ramanaidu, producer
 Married to Rajeswari

Second generation

 Akkineni Sathyavathi; daughter of Nageswara Rao and Annapurna
 Married to Surendra Yarlagadda
 Akkineni Venkat Rathnam producer; son of Nageswara Rao and Annapurna
 Married to Akkineni Jyothsna
 Akkineni Naga Susheeila; daughter of Nageswara Rao and Annapurna
 Married to Anumolu Satya Bhushana Rao
 Saroja Akkineni; daughter of Nageswara Rao and Annapurna
 Nagarjuna actor and producer; son of Nageswara Rao and Annapurna
 Married to Lakshmi Daggubati (divorced)
 Married to Amala Mukherjee, actress
 D. Suresh Babu producer; son of Ramanaidu and Rajeswari
 Married to Lakshmi
 Venkatesh actor; son of Ramanaidu and Rajeswari
 Married to Neeraja
 Lakshmi Daggubati, daughter of Ramanaidu and Rajeswari
 Married to Nagarjuna (divorced)
 Married to Sharath Vijayaraghavan

Third generation

 Sumanth Kumar Yarlagadda, actor; son of Surendra Yarlagadda and Sathyavathi Akkineni
 Married to Keerthi Reddy, actress (divorced)
 Supriya Yarlagadda actress; daughter of Surendra Yarlagadda and Sathyavathi Akkineni
 Married to Charan
 Annapurna Akkineni; daughter of Akkineni Venkat and Akkineni Jyothsna
 Adhithya Akkineni; son of Akkineni Venkat and Akkineni Jyothsna
 Akkineni Naga Chaitanya, actor; son of Nagarjuna and his ex-wife, Daggubati Lakshmi
 Married to Samantha Ruth Prabhu, actress (2017–2021; separated)
 Sushanth Anumolu, actor; son of Anumolu Satya Bhushana Rao and Naga Susheeila Anumolu, paternal grandson of producer A. V. Subba Rao (Anumolu. V. Subba Rao)
 Akhil Akkineni, actor; son of Nagarjuna and Amala
 Rana Daggubati, actor; son of Suresh Babu and Lakshmi
 Married to Miheeka Bajaj
 Abhiram Daggubati; son of Suresh Babu and Lakshmi
 Malavika Daggubati; daughter of Suresh Babu and Lakshmi
 Married to Bharath Krishna Rao
 Aashritha; daughter of Venkatesh and Neeraja
Married to Vinayak Reddy
 Bhavana; daughter of Venkatesh and Neeraja
 Hayavahini; daughter of Venkatesh and Neeraja
 Arjun; son of Venkatesh and Neeraja

See also
 Konidela–Allu family

References

Hindu families
Telugu film families
Families of Indian cinema
Telugu people